Pirmasens-Land is a Verbandsgemeinde ("collective municipality") in the Südwestpfalz district, in Rhineland-Palatinate, Germany. It is situated on the southwestern edge of the Palatinate forest, around Pirmasens. The seat of the municipality is in Pirmasens, itself not part of the municipality.

The Verbandsgemeinde Pirmasens-Land consists of the following Ortsgemeinden ("local municipalities"):

 Bottenbach 
 Eppenbrunn 
 Hilst
 Kröppen 
 Lemberg 
 Obersimten 
 Ruppertsweiler 
 Schweix 
 Trulben 
 Vinningen 

Verbandsgemeinde in Rhineland-Palatinate